Union County Courthouse or Old Union County Courthouse may refer to:

Union County Courthouse (Arkansas), El Dorado, Arkansas
Union County Courthouse (Florida), Lake Butler, Florida
Old Union County Courthouse (Georgia), Blairsville, Georgia
Union County Courthouse (Illinois), Jonesboro, Illinois
Union County Courthouse (Indiana), Liberty, Indiana
Union County Courthouse (Iowa), Creston, Iowa
Union County Courthouse (Kentucky), Morganfield, Kentucky
Union County Courthouse (Mississippi), listed on the National Register of Historic Places
Union County Courthouse (New Jersey), Elizabeth, New Jersey
Union County Courthouse (New Mexico), Clayton, New Mexico
Union County Courthouse (North Carolina), Monroe, North Carolina
Old Union County Courthouse (Pennsylvania), New Berlin, Pennsylvania